The United Nations International School (UNIS) is a private international school in New York City, established in 1947. Many members of the United Nations staff arriving with young families found unexpected difficulties with New York's school system. Among them was K. T. Behanan and his wife, who arrived from India in May 1947 with their 5-year-old son, to work on educational policy at the UN's Trusteeship Council. The Behanans banded together with other UN families who were in a similar situation to establish in 1947 the United Nations International School at Lake Success, with Dr Behanan as chairman of its board. The school was founded to provide an international education, while preserving its students' diverse cultural heritages. Today, UNIS has over 1600 students in one location, serving the United Nations, international and New York communities. The Manhattan campus, overlooking the East River, is K-12; until 2022, the school also ran a K-8 school at a campus in Jamaica Estates, Queens.

UNIS was one of the pilot schools of the International Baccalaureate (IB) and was among those awarding the first diplomas. The comprehensive K12 curriculum prepares UNIS students for the IB, and the school's internationally recognized academic standards enables students to go on to study in top colleges and universities in the United States and worldwide.

The main language of instruction is English and all students study French or Spanish, beginning in elementary school. Arabic, Chinese, German, Italian, Japanese and Russian are also taught beginning in the seventh grade at the Manhattan campus. Additional mother tongues may be studied after school. The school's current executive director is Dan Brenner.

UNIS is a member of the Council of International Schools, the International Baccalaureate Organization, the European Council of International Schools, the New York State Association of Independent Schools, the National Association of Independent Schools, the College Board and is registered with the New York Board of Regents as an independent, not-for-profit school.

Curriculum
In the formative years, UNIS offers a school-designed curriculum, from Kindergarten to Grade 10.  Junior and senior students enroll in the International Baccalaureate Diploma (IBDP) or IB Courses, where a wide range of subjects are offered. Within the framework of IB requirements, students have the possibility to choose from over 200 course combinations.

Students are taught in relatively small classes, with averages of 17 children in kindergarten (JA), 17 in grade 1 (J1), 17 in grade 2 (J2), 19 in grades 34 (J3-J4), and 21 in middle and high school (M1-T4). Emphasis is placed on preparation for the IB exams during High School, for which virtually all seniors sit (full Diploma or Certificate). Children whose parents transfer from abroad to work for the United Nations, Missions to the UN, and Consulates enjoy priority in terms of admission, but admission is not necessarily automatic. All children are required to be interviewed and assessed in person at UNIS, in addition to consideration of official school reports.

The AEFE categorizes this school as a French international school.

University and college attendance 
Nearly all UNIS graduates matriculate at four-year colleges in the semester following graduation, with a small number choosing a gap year program. A typical year will see 75% to 85% of graduates enrolling at colleges in the United States with remaining graduates attending 20 different universities in thirteen countries outside the U.S.

Events and programs 
Each year, high schoolers organize a conference in the General Assembly Hall of the United Nations and invite other schools.  This activity allows students to improve their public speaking and diplomacy skills.  It also allows students to engage with real world issues.

Campus history 
UNIS was founded in 1947. It was previously located in a former school building at 1311 First Avenue, on East 70th Street, in Lenox Hill, Manhattan. In 1964, the Ford Foundation offered a conditional donation of $7 million for a new school building at the headquarters of the United Nations, near an existing playground; Sweden and Libya also contributed funds. UNIS had acquired a site at York Avenue and 89th Street in Yorkville, but sold it in 1965. Two years later, an alternate site south of the UN headquarters was proposed for UNIS. UNIS moved around 1970 into two premises on 51st (the Junior School) and 54th streets. The senior school was housed on East 11th Street.

The main building on 25th Street opened in January 1973, marking the first permanent location for UNIS in its history.

Notable alumni

Ishmael Beah, writer
Byrdie Bell, actress
Yasmine Bleeth, actress
 Kate Burton, actress
Suleiman Braimoh (born 1989), Nigerian-American basketball player in the Israel Basketball Premier League
Andrea Brand, biologist
Dorothy Bush, daughter of George H. W. Bush
Vikram Chatwal, socialite and business tycoon Sant Singh Chatwal
Gary Cohen, TV sports broadcaster
Radhika Coomaraswamy, lawyer and former United Nations Under-Secretary-General
Stéphane Dujarric de la Rivière, United Nations spokesperson
Mohamed A. El-Erian, former CEO of PIMCO
Will Gluck, writer-director
Mike Greenberg, sports radio host
Nicholas Guest, actor
Stephen Hartke, composer
Sarah Jones, actress
Sarah Kay, poet
Rashid Khalidi, Columbia University professor
 Richard Lachmann, sociologist and specialist in comparative historical sociology, professor at University at Albany, SUNY.
Mia Mottley, Prime Minister of Barbados
Joakim Noah, basketball player
Atsushi Ogata, film maker
Amanda Plummer, actress
Elettra Rossellini Wiedemann, food editor and writer, fashion model, and socialite.
Devon Scott, actress
Sitapha Savané, Senegalese retired professional basketball player; member of the Senegal national basketball team.
Qubilah Shabazz, daughter of Malcolm X
Mina Sundwall, actress
S. K. Thoth, performance artist
 Vasili Tsereteli, Russian artist, executive director of the Moscow Museum of Modern Art.
Marius Vassiliou, scientist.
John Zorn, musician

References

External links
 

Educational institutions established in 1947
International Baccalaureate schools in New York (state)
United Nations schools
International schools in New York City
Private K-12 schools in Manhattan
Private K–8 schools in New York City
Middle schools in Queens, New York
Kips Bay, Manhattan
1947 establishments in New York City